Manuel Trappel (born 16 September 1989) is an Austrian professional golfer who in 2011 became the first Austrian winner of the European Amateur. This title brought Trappel an invitation to the 2012 Open Championship.

Trappel won his National Championship before winning the 2011 European Amateur at Halmstad Golf Club in Sweden. He won in a playoff against Walker Cup player Steven Brown.

In September 2011, Trappel played in his first European Tour event, the Austrian Open, where he made the cut and finished tied for 70th place.

In December 2011, Trappel was named the Austrian Golf Association "Golfer of the Year". Trappel lives in Bregenz and studied Economic Law at the University of Innsbruck.

Results in major championships

Note: Trappel only played in The Open Championship.
CUT = missed the half-way cut

Team appearances
Amateur
Eisenhower Trophy (representing Austria): 2012
St Andrews Trophy (representing the Continent of Europe): 2012 (winners)
Bonallack Trophy (representing Europe): 2012 (winners)

References

External links

Austrian male golfers
European Tour golfers
People from Bregenz
1989 births
Living people
Sportspeople from Vorarlberg